Events in the year 1947 in the British Mandate of Palestine.

Incumbents
 High Commissioner – Sir Alan Cunningham

Events

 7 January –  The founding of the kibbutz Mivtahim.
 26 January – Irgun members kidnap a British intelligence officer two days before the planned execution date of the Irgun member Dov Gruner.
 27 January – Irgun members kidnap the British President of the district court of Tel Aviv.
 18 February – British Foreign Minister Ernest Bevin announces that the United Kingdom has decided to give up its mandate over Palestine and allow the United Nations to determine the country's future.
 3 March – 13 people are killed in a raid on a British officer's club in Jerusalem by the Irgun. Simultaneously, multiple other targets throughout Palestine are attacked by the Irgun.
 11 March – The founding of the kibbutz Ma'ayan Barukh.
 4 May – Acre Prison break: Irgun forces break through the walls of the Acre prison and free 28 incarcerated Irgun and Lehi activists. 214 Arab prisoners also escaped.
 16 June – The UNSCOP Committee, the Special UN Committee in charge of finding a solution to the conflict in Palestine, begins its work in Palestine.
 30 June – The founding of the kibbutz Sa'ad.
 11 July – The Exodus leaves France for Palestine, with 4,500 Jewish Holocaust survivor refugees on board who have no legal immigration certificates to enter Palestine.
 12 July – The Irgun kidnaps two British Intelligence Corps NCOs in Netanya, and threatens to kill them if Irgun members death row prisoners held in the Acre prison are executed.
 18 July – Following wide media and UNSCOP coverage, the Exodus is captured by British troops and refused entry into Palestine at the port of Haifa.
 29 July – The British execute three Irgun members captured during the Acre Prison break. In response, the Irgun hangs the two British hostages kidnapped eighteen days earlier.
 28 August – The founding of the Kibbutz HaOgen.
 31 August – The UNSCOP Committee publishes the United Nations Partition Plan for Palestine.
 16 November – The United Kingdom begins withdrawing its army troops from Palestine.
 29 November – The United Nations approves partition of Palestine into Jewish and Arab states. It is accepted by the Jews, but rejected by the Arab leaders (See  ).

1947–1948 Civil War

 30 November – Following the announcement of the Partition Plan, Arabs in Palestine react violently and fighting breaks out leading to the civil war which centered around the Haganah and Palestinian Arabs supported by the Arab Liberation Army.
 2–5 December – 1947 Jerusalem riots: The Arab Higher Committee declares a strike and public protest of the vote. A crowd of Arabs marching to Zion Square, Jerusalem, are stopped by the British, and the Arabs instead turn towards the commercial center of the city, burning many buildings and shops. Violence continued for two more days, with Arab mobs attacking a number of Jewish neighborhoods. 70 Jews and 50 Arabs are killed.
 30 December – Haifa Oil Refinery massacre: Irgun militants hurl two bombs into a crowd of Arab workers from a passing vehicle, killing six workers and wounding 42, damaging the relative peace between the two groups in Haifa. Later that day, the Arab crowd breaks into the refinery compound, killing 39 Jews.

Unknown dates
 The founding of the kibbutz Mashabei Sadeh.
 The founding of the kibbutz Tze'elim.
 The founding of the kibbutz Gevim.

Births
 20 January – Ze'ev Segal, Israeli jurist and journalist (died 2011). 
 21 January – Dan Chamizer, Israeli artist, journalist, and radio and television host.
 22 January – Ali Yahya, Arab-Israeli diplomat, first Israeli-Arab to serve as an ambassador (died 2014).
 30 January – Yehoshua Mondshine, Israeli Rabbi (died 2014).
 4 February – Juval Aviv, Israeli-American security expert.
 22 February – Yehonatan Geffen, Israeli author, poet, songwriter, journalist and playwright.
 31 March – Eliyahu M. Goldratt, Israeli business management guru (died 2011).
 31 March – Ronny Reich, Israeli archaeologist.
 1 April – Tzipi Shavit, Israeli actress, comedian, and entertainer.
 4 April – Israel Sadan, Israeli police colonel, former commander of the Israel Border Police, and Mayor of Hadera.
 22 April – Shmuel Rosenthal, Israeli footballer.
 23 April – Dan Meridor, Israeli politician.
 9 May – David Zilberman, Israeli economist.
 28 May – Boaz Sharabi, Israeli musician.
 3 June – Shuki Levy, Israeli-American composer, writer, director, and executive producer.
 13 June – Elyakim Rubinstein, Israeli jurist, Vice-President of the Israeli Supreme Court.
 25 June – Zvi Galil, Israeli-American computer scientist and mathematician, President of Tel Aviv University
 30 June – Yedidya Ya'ari, Israeli Admiral, commander of the Israeli Navy (2000–2004).
 24 July – Amnon Straschnov, Israeli judge.
 27 July – Giora Spiegel, Israeli footballer.
 4 August – Yael German, Israeli politician.
 4 August – Salim Joubran, Arab-Israeli jurist, judge on the Israeli Supreme Court.
 1 September – Batya Gur, Israeli writer (died 2005).
 15 September – Amos Kollek, Israeli film director, writer, and actor.
 17 September – Ilanit, Israeli singer.
 27 September – Shaul Yahalom, Israeli politician.
 1 October – Aaron Ciechanover, Israeli biologist, recipient of the Nobel Prize in Chemistry.
 2 October – Uzi Arad, Israeli strategist, National Security Advisor, and Mossad officer.
 13 October – Avi Lerner, Israeli-American film producer.
 26 October – Miriam Naor, Israeli jurist, judge on the Israeli Supreme Court.
 23 October – Abdel Aziz al-Rantissi, Palestinian Arab, co-founder of the militant Palestinian Islamist organization Hamas (died 2004).
 7 November – Sefi Rivlin, Israeli actor (died 2013).
Full date unknown
Efrat Natan, Israeli artist.
Minna Rozen, Israeli historian.
Moti Sasson, Israeli politician, current Mayor of Holon.
Avraham Diskin, Israeli political scientist.
 Yael Renan, Israeli writer and translator (died 2020).

Deaths

 16 April 
 Dov Gruner (born 1912), Irgun member captured during a raid on a police station, executed by hanging.
 Yehiel Dresner (born 1922), Irgun member, captured during the Night of the Beatings, executed by hanging.
 Mordechai Alkahi (born 1925), Irgun member, captured during the Night of the Beatings, executed by hanging.
 21 April
 Meir Feinstein (born 1927), Irgun member captured following the bombing of a railway station, committed suicide while awaiting execution.
 Moshe Barazani (born 1926), Lehi member captured carrying a grenade, committed suicide while awaiting execution.
 23 May
 Akiva Aryeh Weiss (born 1868), Zionist activist, one of the founders of Tel Aviv.
 29 July 
 Avshalom Haviv (born 1926), Irgun member and former Palmach member captured during the Acre Prison break, executed by hanging.
 Meir Nakar (born 1926), Irgun member captured during the Acre Prison break, executed by hanging.
 Yaakov Weiss (born 1924), Irgun member captured during the Acre Prison break, and Czech immigrant who saved hundreds of Jews from the Nazis, executed by hanging.
 27 November 
 David Bloch-Blumenfeld (born 1884), Labor Zionist leader and second Mayor of Tel Aviv

 
Palestine
Years in Mandatory Palestine